Janet Lansbury (born Janet Louise Johnson; July 10, 1959) is an American educator who was an actress in film and television, credited as Janet Julian for much of her career.

Biography 
Janet Louise Johnson was born on July 10, 1959, in Evanston, Illinois.

Lansbury got her big break when she won the role of Nancy Drew in the 1970s television series The Hardy Boys/Nancy Drew Mysteries when Pamela Sue Martin left the show in 1978. Her other well-known TV role came a year later on the Cult TV series B. J. and the Bear as Tommy. She starred on the evening soap opera Falcon Crest in 1989 as Cookie Nash.

Lansbury made guest appearances on several TV shows, among them Battlestar Galactica, The Fall Guy, Knight Rider, Fudge, Columbo,  Swamp Thing, 240 Robert, Murder, She Wrote, and Diagnosis: Murder. Her first film role was in the 1978 movie Big Wednesday. She also appeared in the 1990 cult film King of New York.

Lansbury left acting in 1995 to raise her three children with husband Michael Lansbury, and she later became a parent educator. She has served on the Board of Directors of Resources for Infant Educators (RIE) since 1995 and teaches RIE Parent/Infant Guidance Classes. In 2009, she began a parent education blog. She later published two books, Elevating Child Care: A Guide to Respectful Parenting and No Bad Kids: Toddler Discipline Without Shame. In 2015, Lansbury launched Janet Lansbury Unruffled, a podcast series about respectful parenting.

Filmography

References

External links 
 
 
 
 
 https://www.janetlansbury.com/

1959 births
20th-century American actresses
American film actresses
American television actresses
American bloggers
Living people
Actresses from Evanston, Illinois
American soap opera actresses
American women bloggers
21st-century American actresses